The Mobile Motion Film Festival is a film festival in Switzerland. The festival was founded in 2014 by Andrea Holle with money raised via kickstarter.com. To be selected for the festival films must have been shot using smartphones or other mobile devices. In recent years, any film duration is accepted.

References

External links
 "Ruhe bitte, Smartphone läuft!"
 Wenn talentierte Handyfilmer dem grossen Kino nacheifern
 Jeder kann jetzt Kino machen

Official sites
 Official Site

Film festivals in Switzerland
Short film festivals